Daniele Brusaschetto (born in Turin in 1973) is an Italian songwriter and musician.

He has been active as a soloist since the middle of the 1990s.  The releases under his own name are characterized by the union of elements 
of soundscapes and electronics and an intimate writing. The result is a
sort of industrial songwriting.

Early career 

Brusaschetto started playing music at the end of the 80's,
playing in thrash death metal bands.
At the beginning of the 90's his career became more structured, and
he joined bands such as Mudcake (noise rock), Whip (industrial rock) and
Down! (avantgarde improvisation).

Solo Project 

In the middle of the 90's, Daniele Brusaschetto began playing and
recording under his own name.
His music, hanging in the balance between soundscapes and songwriting, is mainly based on the use of vocals, guitar, pedal effects and laptop.

Discography (selected)

Studio albums
 1997 – Bellies/Pance
 1999 – Mamma Fottimi
 2001 – Bluviola
 2003 – Poesia Totale Dei Muscoli
 2005 – Mezza Luna Piena
 2007 – Circonvoluzioni
 2009 – Blasé
 2010 – Fragranze Silenzio
 2012 – Cielo Inchiostro
 2014 – Rapida E Indolore
 2016 – Radio Stridentia
 2019 – Flying Stag

Singles 
 1996 – Paturnie

Live albums
 2006 – Live at the Satyricon

Additional musicians 

 Alberto "Mono" Marietta – drums (2016–present)
 Daniele Pagliero – bass (2020–present)
 Marco Rinaldi – guitarbass (2019)
 Francesco Borello – bass (2017 - 2018)
 Francesco Lurgo – electronics, guitar (2014 - 2016)
 Marco Milanesio – electronics, keyboard (2014 - 2015)
 Paolo Inverni – guitar (2007 - 2008)
 Bruno Dorella – drums (2000 - 2003)
 Marco "Il Bue" Schiavo – drums (1999 - 2000)
 Maurizio Suppo – bass (1997)
 Mirco Rizzi – guitarbass (1996 - 2003)

External links 
 Daniele Brusaschetto Official Site
 Daniele Brusaschetto on Discogs

Italian singer-songwriters
Living people
1973 births